Sitona lepidus or clover root weevil is a species of weevil found in Europe. It has now spread to North America and New Zealand.

S. lepidus was found in New Zealand pastures in 1996 and poses a threat to farm productivity since it damages the clover plant. The use of the parasitic wasp Microctonus aethiopoides as a biological control is under way in Southland, New Zealand.

References

External links 
Clover Root Weevil at the New Zealand Landcare Trust
Clover root weevil in the South Island (New Zealand)

Entiminae
Agricultural pest insects
Beetles described in 1834